In mathematics, lifting theory was first introduced by John von Neumann in a pioneering paper from 1931, in which he answered a question raised by Alfréd Haar. The theory was further developed by Dorothy Maharam (1958) and by Alexandra Ionescu Tulcea and Cassius Ionescu Tulcea (1961). Lifting theory was motivated to a large extent by its striking applications. Its development up to 1969 was described in a monograph of the Ionescu Tulceas. Lifting theory continued to develop since then, yielding new results and applications.

Definitions

A lifting on a measure space  is a linear and multiplicative operator

which is a right inverse of the quotient map

Liftings are used to produce disintegrations of measures, for instance conditional probability distributions given continuous random variables, and fibrations of Lebesgue measure on the level sets of a function.

Existence of liftings

Theorem. Suppose  is complete. Then  admits a lifting if and only if there exists a collection of mutually disjoint integrable sets in  whose union is 

In particular, if  is the completion of a σ-finite measure or of an inner regular Borel measure on a locally compact space, then  admits a lifting.

The proof consists in extending a lifting to ever larger sub-σ-algebras, applying Doob's martingale convergence theorem if one encounters a countable chain in the process.

Strong liftings

Then the support of   can be defined as the complement of the largest negligible open subset, and the collection  of bounded continuous functions belongs to 

 

Theorem. If  is σ-finite and complete and  has a countable basis then  admits a strong lifting.

Proof.

 is the desired strong lifting.

Application: disintegration of a measure

Disintegrations exist in various circumstances, the proofs varying but almost all using strong liftings. Here is a rather general result. Its short proof gives the general flavor.

Theorem. Suppose  is a Polish space and  a separable Hausdorff space, both equipped with their Borel σ-algebras.

Proof. To see how the strongness of the lifting enters, note that

References

Measure theory